This is the list of episodes of Crimewatch since 1993, with airing timings for the show from 2009 onwards. 

Crimewatch is aired in four different languages all through Mediacorp. The Mandarin version, 绳之以法, is aired on Channel 8. The English version, Crimewatch, is aired on Channel 5. The Tamil version, Kutra Kannkaanippu, is aired on Vasantham. The Malay version, Jejak Jenayah, is aired on Suria. The show is also accessible in all four languages through MeWATCH.

Series overview 
Airdates based on English language showings only.

1980s

1990s

2000s

2010s

2020s

Episodes

Season 1 (1987)

Season 2 (1988)

Season 3 (1989)

Season 4 (1990)

Season 5 (1991)

Season 6 (1992)

Season 7 (1993)

Season 8 (1994)

Season 9 (1995)

Season 10 (1996)

Season 11 (1997)

Season 12 (1998)

Season 13 (1999)

Season 14 (2000)

Season 15 (2001)

Season 16 (2002)

Season 17 (2003)

Season 18 (2004)

Season 19 (2005)

Season 20 (2006)

Season 21 (2007)

Season 22 (2008)

Season 23 (2009)

Season 24 (2010)

Season 25 (2011)

Season 26 (2012)

Season 27 (2013)

Season 28 (2014)

Season 29 (2015)

Season 30 (2016)

Season 31 (2017)

Season 32 (2018)

Season 33 (2019)

Season 34 (2020)

Season 35 (2021)

Season 36 (2022)

Season 37 (2023)

See also
Crimewatch (Singaporean TV series)
Singapore Police Force

References

External links

Singapore Police Force
Lists of Singaporean television series episodes